Johann Franz Peter Paul Gareis (28 June 1775, Ostritz - 31 May 1803, Rome) was a German portrait painter and illustrator.

Life and work 
At the age of sixteen, he went to Dresden to inquire about the possibility of being admitted to the Academy of Fine Arts. After some preparatory studies and submissions, he became a student of the academy's Director, Giovanni Battista Casanova, a brother of the famous adventurer, Giacomo Casanova. His first exhibit at the academy, in 1794, drew much positive attention.

He completed his work there shortly after and went on a study trip to Danzig, Narva and Memel, then back through Berlin to Dresden. In 1796, he was awarded an annual government pension of 100 Thalers. From 1798, he moved frequently, to Halle (1798), Leipzig (1799), Vienna (1799), Berlin (1800), Paris (1801) and finally to Rome (1803), painting numerous portraits all along the way. Shortly after arriving in Rome, however, he fell ill with typhus and died. He was interred near the Pyramid of Cestius at the Protestant Cemetery.

At the time of his death, he was engaged to the singer and composer, Louise Reichardt; daughter of the composer, Johann Friedrich Reichardt.

His works include an altarpiece at the church in Reichenau (1798) and the canvas "Orpheus – Lament Before the God of the Underworld", which he had sent to Dresden for an exhibition, shortly before his death. A sketch book from his trip to Russia is preserved at the Kupferstichkabinett Dresden.

References

Further reading 
 
 Kai Wenzel und Marius Winzler (Herausgeber): Franz Gareis (1775-1803). Zum Maler geboren. Gemälde, Zeichnungen und Druckgrafik eines Wegbereiters der deutschen Romantik. Verlag Gunter Oettel, Görlitz 2003, 
 Frauke Josenhans: Gareis, Franz (Johann Franz Peter Paul). In: Bénédicte Savoy und France Nerlich (Hrsg.): Pariser Lehrjahre. Ein Lexikon zur Ausbildung deutscher Maler in der französischen Hauptstadt. Vol.1: 1793–1843. Berlin/Boston 2013, pps.83–86.

External links 

 
 Franz Gareis, Kunstmaler, 1775-1803 @ the Gareis Family Archives

1775 births
1803 deaths
People from Ostritz
People from the Electorate of Saxony
18th-century German painters
18th-century German male artists
German male painters
19th-century German painters
19th-century German male artists